Al-Tweinah is a town in central al-Hasakah Governorate, northeastern Syria.

Administratively the town belongs to the Nahiya al-Hasakah of al-Hasakah District. At the 2004 census, it had a population of 5,062.

References

Towns in Syria